The Conservative is a journal of cultural and political affairs established in September 2016 by Daniel Hannan.

In the founding statement, Hannan rejects "the grievance and victimhood" that he believes characterize the Left in favour of  "respect for the things that make us what we are: our nations, our laws, our families, our customs."

Writers include Jay Nordlinger on music, and Iain Martin on wine.

References

External links
  The Conservative

Conservative magazines published in the United Kingdom
Magazines established in 2016
Political magazines published in the United Kingdom
Quarterly magazines published in the United Kingdom